The first series of the music talent show The X Factor Greece began airing on ANT1 on 4 October 2008 and was won by Loukas Giorkas on 30 January 2009. The show was presented by Sakis Rouvas. It was also broadcast abroad via ANT1's international stations.

Selection process

Auditions 
Public auditions by aspiring pop singers began in July 2008 and concluded in September 2008. The auditions were held in three cities: in Athens and Thessaloniki (Greece) and Larnaka (Cyprus).

Bootcamp 
Following initial auditions, the "Boot camp" stage took place in September 2008. Approximately 200 acts attended Boot Camp. They were initially split into groups of three, and judges gave instant decisions on who would leave based on the group performances, bringing the number of acts down to 150. The judges then cut the number of acts down to 80. They were split into four categories: Boys, Girls, Over 25s and Groups, before the judges discovered which category they would mentor for the rest of the competition. The Boys (16–24) were mentored by Katerina Gagaki, George Levendis had the Girls (16–24), Nikos Mouratidis mentored the Over 25s, and Giorgos Theofanous took charge of the Groups. At the last stage of boot camp only 32 remained.

Judges Houses 
During "Judges' Houses", the judges welcomed the eight acts from their selected category to their "homes". Each act had only one chance to impress their mentor who had the task of selecting which three acts were to go through to the live shows and which three would be eliminated.

The sixteen eliminated acts were:

 Boys 16-24 – Mixalis Zeis, Vasilis Pachis, Maurikios Maurikiou, Akis Panagiotidis
 Girls 16-24 – Eugenia Mpalafa, Eua Tsachra, Ifigenia Stefanou, Basiliki Papada
 Over 25s – 
 Groups –

Contestants and categories
The final 16 acts were confirmed as follows:

Key:
 – Winner
 – Runner-up
 – Third Place

Live shows
The live shows started on 23 October 2009. The acts are performing every Friday night with the results announced on the same day.

Results summary
Colour key

Week 12 (23 January Semi-Final)
Themes: Mentor's choice and Free choice
Celebrity performers: Tamta  "Koita me", "Agapise me" / Korgialas and Evridiki "Mia fora", "xwris esena", "geia sou", "Comme Ci, Comme Ça"

Judges' votes to eliminate
Giorgos Theofanous: Ioanna Protopappa
George Levendis: Triimitonio
Katerina Gagaki: Ioanna Protopappa
Nikos Mouratidis: Ioanna Protopappa

Week 13 (30 January Final)
Themes: Mentor's choice, Free choice and Final choice
Celebrity performers: Natasha Theodoridou  "Fegari", "Dipla Se Sena", "Apantise mou", "Oneiro"

* Eliminated by public vote, after the judges forced a tie.

Greece 01